Iskushuban Airport  is an airport serving Iskushuban, Somalia.

See also
Transport in Somalia

References                

 OurAirports - Somalia
  Great Circle Mapper - Iskushuban
 Iskushuban
 Google Earth
 OpenMap Maps

Airports in Somalia